Edgemead is one of the Northern Suburbs of Cape Town. It is one of several garden cities of South Africa, the first being Pinelands in the southern suburbs. Edgemead is mainly residential, and as the name 'garden city' suggests, is noted for its trees, gardens and generally pleasant environment. Other 'garden cities' that have followed are Pinehurst near Durbanville on the northwestern outskirts of the Cape Metropole, still under construction but already occupied, and Sunningdale near Milnerton.

There are two schools in Edgemead: Edgemead Primary and Edgemead High.

Edgemead has the Edgemead Cricket Club  (ECC), which has recently been promoted to the premier league. And The Edgemead Football Club, Or Edgemead Goodwood P.P.V. The neighbourhood is also the location of the Goodwood Centre of Excellence, a medium security prison run by the South African Department of Correctional Services.

References

Suburbs of Cape Town